Edith Kuiper (born 1960) is the assistant professor of economics at State University of New York at New Paltz, and she was the president of the International Association for Feminist Economics (IAFFE) from 2006 to 2007.

In 1993 Kuiper organized a conference in Amsterdam called, Out of the Margins: feminist perspectives on economic theory. The conference provided a networking opportunity which resulted in the founding of FENN, the Feminist Economics Network in the Netherlands. Further networking led to the formation of the European 'chapter' of IAFFE being established, IAFFE European chapter's first meeting was held at the second Out of the Margins conference in 1998.

Her research areas are the history and philosophy of economics.

Education 
In February 2001 Kuiper gained her doctorate in economics from the University of Amsterdam.

Selected bibliography

Books 
 
  Title page.

Chapters in books 
 
  Preview.

Working papers

See also 
 Feminist economics
 List of feminist economists

References 

1960 births
Living people
Dutch economists
Dutch women economists
Feminist economists
Historians of economic thought
State University of New York at New Paltz faculty
University of Amsterdam alumni
Presidents of the International Association for Feminist Economics